Thomas Greger Forslöw (born 27 May 1961) is a Swedish fencer. He competed in the individual and team épée events at the 1984 Summer Olympics.

References

External links
 
 Spetskompetens

1961 births
Living people
Swedish male épée fencers
Olympic fencers of Sweden
Fencers at the 1984 Summer Olympics
Sportspeople from Stockholm
Swedish dentists
20th-century Swedish people